The Happy Blues is an album by saxophonist Gene Ammons recorded in 1956 and released on the Prestige label.

Reception

The AllMusic review by Scott Yanow stated: "This is one of the great studio jam sessions... a highly recommended set".

Track listing 
 "The Happy Blues" (Art Farmer) – 12:08     
 "The Great Lie" (Cab Calloway, Andy Gibson) – 8:42     
 "Can't We Be Friends?" (Paul James, Kay Swift) – 12:54     
 "Madhouse" (Jackie McLean) – 6:42

Personnel 
Gene Ammons – tenor saxophone
Art Farmer – trumpet
Jackie McLean – alto saxophone
Duke Jordan – piano
Addison Farmer – bass
Art Taylor – drums
Candido – congas

References 

Gene Ammons albums
1956 albums
Prestige Records albums
Albums produced by Bob Weinstock
Albums recorded at Van Gelder Studio